Michel Crousillat (born 15 January 1962) is a French former water polo player. He competed in the men's tournament at the 1988 Summer Olympics.

References

External links
 

1962 births
Living people
French male water polo players
Olympic water polo players of France
Water polo players at the 1988 Summer Olympics
Water polo players from Marseille